The National Democratic Union (UDN) was a political alliance of parties for the 1946 general election, formed by the Italian Liberal Party, the Labour Democratic Party and some other liberal, conservative and monarchist clubs. Its symbol was an Italian flag overcome by a shining star.

History
The party scored 6.8%, placing itself at the fourth place in the election. This grouping, during the sessions of the Constituent Assembly, represented the continuation of the Liberal elite, which governed Italy from the years of Giovanni Giolitti until the rise of Benito Mussolini and the instauration of the Fascist regime.

Important politicians elected on the UDN lists were Vittorio Emanuele Orlando, Francesco Saverio Nitti, Luigi Einaudi, Benedetto Croce, Enrico De Nicola, Gaetano Martino, Giuseppe Paratore, Ivanoe Bonomi, Raffaele De Caro, Meuccio Ruini, Enrico Molè, Bruno Villabruna, Epicarmo Corbino and Aldo Bozzi.

The alliance was succeeded in the 1948 general election by the National Bloc.

Composition
It was composed of the following political parties:

Electoral results

References

1946 establishments in Italy
Political parties established in 1946
Defunct political party alliances in Italy